Maxie D. Dunnam (1934-) is a United Methodist Church minister, evangelist, Bible commentator and writer. He is a past president of World Methodist Council. He is currently President Emeritus of Asbury Theological Seminary.

Biography
Dunnam was born in Deemer, Mississippi (12 Aug. 1934). He was educated at the University of Southern Mississippi and gained a B.Sc. in 1955 then a M.Th. from Emory University in 1958. In 1977 he was conferred a D.D. from Asbury Theological Seminary.

Dunnam's extensive pastoral experience includes church planting, rural churches, and suburban and regional congregations in Mississippi, Georgia, California.

He created the Upper Room Cursillo that later became the Walk to Emmaus. Dunnam is one of the founders and leaders of the Confessing Movement within the United Methodist Church.He became the world editor of The Upper Room Fellowship.

From 1982 to 1994, he served twelve fruitful years as senior minister of the six-thousand-member Christ United Methodist Church in Memphis, Tennessee.  

He served as president and chancellor of Asbury Theological Seminary in Wilmore, Kentucky, from 1994 through 2004. He is currently president Emeritus there. 

He has served as president of the World Methodist Council and is currently on its executive committee. He also served as chairman of the Methodist World Evangelism Committee. He is a director of the Board of Global Ministries of the United Methodist Church and a member of the executive committee of the Association of Theological Schools. 

He has authored more than forty books, most notably The Workbook of Living Prayer, which sold over one million copies, Alive in Christ, This Is Christianity, and two volumes in The Communicator’s Commentary series. He is also well known for his radio series "Perceptions."

Theology
Dunnam, along with many other visionaries within the church, were influenced by the teachings and leadership of the Rev. Sam S. Barefield, Jr, Wesley Foundation Director at Mississippi Southern from 1950 - 1957. He is recognized as a representative of the Wesleyan-Arminian tradition.

Awards
In October 1989, Dunnam was inducted into Evangelism's “Hall of Fame” by the Foundation for Evangelism as one of Forty Distinguished Evangelists of the Methodist world. In 1991 he received the World Methodist Council Chair of Honor. He received The Philip Award for Distinguished Service in Evangelism, presented by the National Association of United Methodist Evangelists in 1993.

Publications

Books

Notes and references

Citations

Sources

External links

1934 births
American evangelicals
American United Methodist clergy
Arminian ministers
Arminian theologians
Asbury Theological Seminary alumni
Bible commentators
Methodist writers
Emory University alumni
Living people
University of Southern Mississippi alumni